Tobagoa is a genus of flowering plants belonging to the family Rubiaceae.

Its native range is Panama to Tobago.

Species:
 Tobagoa maleolens Urb. 
 Tobagoa perijaensis (Steyerm.) R.M.Salas & E.L.Cabral

References

Rubiaceae
Rubiaceae genera